General elections were held in Zambia on 5 December 1973. They were the first elections held since the country was formally declared a one-party state in August, with the United National Independence Party (UNIP) as the only legally permitted party. UNIP leader Kenneth Kaunda was automatically elected to a third five-year term as President, and was confirmed in office via a referendum in which 88.8% of voters approved his candidacy. UNIP also won all 125 seats in the National Assembly. Voter turnout was 39% of the 1,746,107 registered voters for the presidential election, and 33% for the National Assembly election.

Prior to the elections, primary elections were held to elect candidates for the 125 constituencies. Only UNIP members could vote in the primaries, and the top three candidates would be able to stand for the National Assembly election. In total, 532 people stood for election to the National Assembly.

Results

President
Kaunda was the sole candidate for president, and voters voted yes or no to his candidacy.

National Assembly

See also
List of members of the National Assembly of Zambia (1973–78)

References

Zambia
1973 in Zambia
Elections in Zambia
One-party elections
Presidential elections in Zambia